The  Rheinsteig is a hiking trail following a mainly elevated path along the east bank of the Rhine River in Germany.  Its  route stretches from Bonn to Wiesbaden, running parallel to the Rheinhöhenweg Trail and Rheinburgenweg Trail.

Description

The Rheinsteig passes through woodlands and vineyards, and has challenging ascents and descents. It is signposted by signs with an 'R' on a blue background. The Rheinsteig allows either longer-distance hiking or a number of short tours.

Route and sights of interest 
Wiesbaden-Biebrich, Schloss Biebrich, Wiesbaden-Schierstein, Goethestein, Burg Frauenstein, Wiesbaden-Frauenstein
Schlangenbad, Burg Scharfenstein, Kiedrich,
Eberbach Abbey (Kloster Eberbach), Steinberg, Schloss Vollrads
Johannisberg (Geisenheim), Schloss Johannisberg,
Marienthal Monastery, Eibingen Abbey,
Rüdesheim am Rhein, Niederwalddenkmal, Assmannshausen
Lorch, Ruine Nollig, Burg Gutenfels
Kaub, Dörscheid, Lorelei
Sankt Goarshausen, Nochern, Burg Maus
Kestert, Lykershausen, Burg Liebenstein, Burg Sterrenberg, Filsen
Osterspai, Marksburg
Braubach
Lahnstein, Oberlahnstein, Niederlahnstein, Lahneck Castle
Koblenz-Ehrenbreitstein, Ehrenbreitstein Fortress
Vallendar
Sayn (part of Bendorf)
Rengsdorf
Leutesdorf
Rheinbrohl
Leubsdorf, Linz am Rhein
Unkel
Bad Honnef, Drachenfels
Königswinter
Niederdollendorf
Kennedy Bridge, Bonn

Literature and maps
Opened on September 8, 2005, hikers can find maps and books giving information about where to join and leave the track, should hikers want to do just a short section.

Gallery

References

External links

www.rheinsteig.de Official website
The Rhine Trail - Rheinsteig
loreley-info
GPS track and tour guide

Hiking trails in Hesse
Hiking trails in North Rhine-Westphalia
Hiking trails in Rhineland-Palatinate
Taunus
Middle Rhine
Rheingau